The baggy green is a cricket cap of dark myrtle green colour, which has been worn by Australian Test cricketers since around the turn of the twentieth century. The cap was not originally baggy as evidenced by photographs of early players. The cap has long been a symbol of national pride in Australia, and was described by the chief executive of the MCC as the "most famous cricket cap in the world".

While respect for the baggy green cap has always been very high, it has grown in stature since the 1990s, chiefly due to the efforts of captains Mark Taylor and Steve Waugh. Waugh regularly expressed his belief that the honouring of the traditions of the game was critical to the success of a team: "To be able to partake of these rituals and traditions has meant you have been awarded the highest honour in Australian cricket — you have been selected to play for your country." 

The baggy green cap was originally supplied to the player as part of a kit of equipment, and a new one was routinely issued for each tour, with the year number on it. In fact, a few former Australian players have been known to use the cap for 'non-cricketing' purposes. Bill Lawry used the cap while cleaning his pigeon's nest, while Bill Ponsford was known to wear the cap to protect his hair while painting the fence in front of his house. Ian Chappell never kept any of his baggy green caps. In the early 1990s an unofficial practice emerged amongst test players never to replace a baggy green cap, most notably by Steve Waugh. Although there is no official rule against a player obtaining a replacement cap from Cricket Australia, this almost never occurs, and the increasingly dilapidated state of an aging baggy green cap is a de facto symbol of seniority amongst the players in the team.

During his captaincy Taylor instituted a pre-match ceremony for the awarding of a cap. This continued under Waugh, who introduced a refinement whereby new players would receive their "baggy green" from a past player of a similar discipline (batsman, spin bowler, etc.). Ponting changed it again, making the presentation himself rather than using a former player. Another tradition instituted by Taylor (but suggested by Steve Waugh, and one that has also continued) is the practice of all players wearing the cap during the first session in the field of a Test match, as a symbol of solidarity. Even Shane Warne, known for his preference for a floppy sun hat, observed this tradition without question. Modern players seldom wear the baggy green cap while batting, choosing a protective helmet instead, especially when facing faster bowlers.

Baggy green caps can in some cases be prized as valuable sporting memorabilia. The cap worn by 
Sir Donald Bradman during his final season in 1948 sold in 2003 for A$425,000, and the 1953 cap of Keith Miller sold at auction for A$35,000. Even the caps of lesser-known players have fetched figures above A$10,000. The baggy green of Shane Warne was sold at auction, purchased by the Commonwealth Bank in January 2020 for A$1,007,500. Warne's cap is to be taken on a national tour, and subsequently put on display in the International Cricket Hall of Fame. The proceeds from the auction are to be used to support emergency services responding to 2019–20 Australian bushfire season.

Coat of arms
Sometimes incorrectly called a "crest", the "achievement" or coat of arms on the Baggy Green cap is a pre-federation symbol representing Australian commercial endeavours of the time: wool-growing, shipping, mining and  agriculture.

It consists of: a crest (being a rising sun); over a torse (or wreath) of red and gold; over a shield (bearing images of a golden fleece, a sailing ship, a pick-axe and shovel and a garb of wheat, all quartered by a southern cross); supporters (being a kangaroo and an emu); all over a motto ("Australia") on a scroll.

The baggy green worn by male players has the motto in gold on a red background; on the women's baggy green, the motto and background colours are reversed.

Contrary to a common belief, with the exception of the supporters and the motto, this coat of arms is entirely different from the present and any former national coat of arms. Since 1912 the Coat of Arms of Australia has borne the badges of the six Australian states, enclosed and unified on a shield under a wreath of blue and gold bearing a Commonwealth Star.

The device on the cap is sometimes referred to as Australia's Cricket Coat of Arms, although it has otherwise been abandoned by Cricket Australia. It is replicated on the protective helmet, but not on any other badged item of clothing worn by the Australian team. These now feature the current emblem of Cricket Australia, being a modern distorted shield with the ubiquitous Southern Cross on a green and gold field of a rising sun and a wicket casting a shadow on a pitch.

Commercial availability
Unlike virtually any other item of cricket kit, replicas of the Baggy Green are not licensed for sale by Cricket Australia, the theory being that the Baggy Green can never be bought, only earned. The item is not available from the Cricket Australia Store, or from Kookabura Sport, the company that manufactures the Baggy Green. Any replicas available online are unlicensed/counterfeit.

See also

Cricket cap
Baseball cap
Beret
Flat cap

References

Further reading

External links

Australia in international cricket
Cricket equipment
Caps
Sportswear
Australian headgear